Hilmi Mihçi (Baarn, 8 July 1976) is a Dutch former footballer of Turkish descent.

Club career
A journeyman striker, Mihci began his career at FC Den Bosch and currently plays for Dutch top amateur side IJsselmeervogels, with whom he won the Dutch Amateur League title in June 2010.

References

External links
 Hilmi Mihçi at VoetbalInternational 

1976 births
Living people
People from Baarn
Dutch footballers
Dutch people of Turkish descent
FC Den Bosch players
FC Eindhoven players
MSV Duisburg players
De Graafschap players
SC Telstar players
Almere City FC players
Enosis Neon Paralimni FC players
Sivasspor footballers
Helmond Sport players
Eerste Divisie players
2. Bundesliga players
Süper Lig players
Cypriot First Division players
Dutch expatriate footballers
Expatriate footballers in Germany
Expatriate footballers in Turkey
Expatriate footballers in Cyprus
Association football forwards
Footballers from Utrecht (province)
Dutch expatriate sportspeople in Cyprus
Dutch expatriate sportspeople in Germany
Dutch expatriate sportspeople in Turkey